The Brooklyn-class cruiser was a class of nine light cruisers built for the United States Navy between 1935 and 1938. Armed with five triple  gun turrets (three forward, two aft), they mounted more main battery guns than any other standard US cruiser. The Brooklyn-class ships were all commissioned between 1937 and 1939, in the time between the start of the Second Sino-Japanese War and before the invasion of Poland. They served extensively in both the Pacific and Atlantic theaters during World War II.

 was sunk in the Pacific, and while some of the others were heavily damaged, the remaining ships of the class were decommissioned shortly after the end of the war. Six were transferred to South American navies in 1951, where they served for many more years. One of these, formerly , was sunk during the Falklands War in 1982.

The Brooklyn-class ships had a strong influence on US cruiser design. Nearly all subsequent US cruisers, heavy and light, were directly or indirectly based on them.

Design 
The Brooklyn-class design was a further refinement of the  heavy cruiser that preceded it. Great Britain needed trade control cruisers and hoped that the treaty would limit nations to smaller cruisers with a  range that she could afford. Agreement to the London Treaty and the proceeding with the American light cruiser design can be focused to Admiral William V. Pratt, who overrode the vehement objections of the General Board.

The United States needed large cruisers to deal with the extreme ranges that operations in the Pacific Ocean required. The light hull design caused a stressed hull and was very overweight. Design started in 1930, with the first four of the class ordered in 1933, and an additional three ships in 1934. Basic criteria had been that speed and range should match heavy cruisers, and when the Japanese  carrying fifteen 6-inch main guns appeared, the new US ships would match their weaponry. Various combinations of armor and power plants were tried in the efforts to stay below the Treaty 10,000 ton limit. Aviation facilities were moved to the stern of the ship from the amidships position of the New Orleans-class cruisers.

From 1942, the bridge structure was lowered and radar was fitted.

St. Louis subclass
Additionally, AA armament was improved. They were the first US cruisers to be armed with twin 5-inch (127 mm)/38-caliber guns. They could be distinguished visually from the other Brooklyns by the placement of the after deckhouse, immediately abaft the second funnel, and by the twin 5-inch mounts.

Armament 

The Brooklyn class was equipped with 15 6-inch/47 caliber Mark 16 naval guns, developed from the 6-inch/53 caliber Mark 8 used on the Omaha-class cruiser. The decision was reached as the gun could achieve up to ten rounds per minute rate of fire. This gave the class the ability to send up to 150 rounds a minute at its intended target. This allowed the cruiser to smother an enemy ship with fire. The turret arrangement was five turrets, each mounting three guns on a single sleeve, which did not allow the guns in a turret to move independently. The ammunition was of the semi-fixed type. The impact of the shell changed the General Board's view on the usefulness of light cruisers in service.

As designed, the anti-aircraft weaponry specified eight /25 caliber guns and eight  caliber M2 Browning machine guns. The intention to mount /75 caliber anti-aircraft guns was frustrated and the requirement was not fully met until 1943. The weapon as deployed was less than satisfactory with frequent jamming and weight being serious issues. Some of the class had 5-in/38 caliber guns installed versus the 5-in/25 guns. There were varied mixes of  Oerlikon cannons and  Bofors gun mountings actually installed during World War II, 28 40 mm (4 × 4, 6 × 2) and twenty 20 mm (10 × 2) being the most common.

Fire control 

The Brooklyn class was deployed with the Mark 34 director and later the Mark 3 radar. This would be upgraded to the Mark 8 and again to the Mark 13 radar. The secondary battery was controlled by the Mark 28 and upgraded to the Mark 33 fire control systems. The associated radars were the Mark 4 fire control radar and upgraded again to the Mark 12. Two anti-aircraft fire directors were fitted to each ship. A late World War II refit saw the Mk 51 director installed for the Bofors guns. Night engagements were improved when in 1945, the Mark 57 and 63 directors were installed.

Successors 
The vast majority of cruisers built by the United States during World War II derive from the Brooklyn design. Modifications of the Brooklyn-class hull were the predecessors to the two main lines of wartime cruisers, respectively the  light cruiser armed with 6-inch guns and  heavy cruiser armed with 8-inch guns. The third line, the  light cruiser armed with 5-inch guns, shared the same unit system of machinery arrangement as the other two lines, but on a smaller hull with two shafts instead of four.

Wichita was succeeded by the Baltimore class and the later  class, and finally the upgraded . As the Baltimore class began building about a year after the Cleveland class, later Cleveland developments and improvements were incorporated into the Baltimore-class hull.

Finally, both Cleveland and Baltimore hulls were converted to light aircraft carriers. The  of light aircraft carriers, were converted from Cleveland-class cruisers under construction, and the  light carriers used the basic form of the Baltimore-class cruiser design.

Ships in class

Service history

War service 
Several Brooklyns were seriously damaged during World War II, although all but one of the cruisers survived.  was severely damaged by a shell that hit her forward turret magazine during the Battle of Cape Esperance on 11 October 1942, suffering many casualties, but the magazine (being partially flooded as a result of shell hits in her hull) did not explode.  was hit by a kamikaze attack on 13 December 1944, off Mindoro, which killed or wounded 310 crewmen.  was torpedoed at the Battle of Kolombangara on 12–13 July 1943, as was her near-sister . After being repaired in the United States, Honolulu returned to service only to be torpedoed by a Japanese aircraft on 20 October 1944, during the invasion of Leyte. On 11 September 1943,  was hit by a German Fritz X radio guided bomb which penetrated her #3 turret and blew out the bottom of the ship. Skillful damage control by her crew saved her from sinking.

Helena was sunk in 1943 during the Battle of Kula Gulf. The remains of the ship were discovered below the surface of New Georgia Sound by Paul Allen's research ship  in April 2018. St. Louis was seriously damaged twice, but survived the war.

Post-war 
All ships of the class went into reserve in 1946-47. Six were sold to South American countries in the early 1950s, and served for many more years: Brooklyn and Nashville to Chile, St. Louis and Philadelphia to Brazil, and Boise and Phoenix to Argentina. Savannah and Honolulu remained in reserve until struck in 1959.  (ex-Phoenix) was torpedoed and sunk by  during the Falklands War, while  (ex-Brooklyn) remained in service with the Chilean Navy until 1992. She sank under tow, on her way to the scrappers, in the mid-Pacific in 1992.

See also 
 List of cruisers of the United States Navy
 List of ships of the Second World War
 List of ship classes of the Second World War

Citations

Sources 

 
 
 
 
 
 
 

Cruiser classes